"Let's Get It On / Do You Wanna Dance?" is the fourth single released by Australian singer Peter Andre from his self-titled debut album. The single was released on 22 November 1993, through Melodian Records. "Let's Get It On" features a rap from American rapper Eric Sebastian. The single peaked at #17 on the Australian Singles Chart.

Track listing
 CD1 / Cassette 
 "Let's Get It On" (Extended Dance Version) (Featuring Eric Sebastian) – 5:03
 "Do You Wanna Dance?" (Jamakin-It-Funky Mix) – 3:23

 CD2
 "Let's Get It On" (Featuring Eric Sebastian) – 4:11
 "Do You Wanna Dance?" (Jamakin-It-Funky Mix) – 3:23
 "Let's Get It On" (Midnight Mix) – 5:18

Charts

References

1993 singles
1992 songs
Peter Andre songs
Songs written by Peter Andre